Palatka is a city in and the county seat of Putnam County, Florida, United States. The population was 10,558 at the 2010 census. It is the county seat of Putnam County.  Palatka is the principal city of the Palatka Micropolitan Statistical Area, which is home to 72,893 residents. The city is also home to St. Johns River State College, St. Johns River Water Management District Headquarters, and Ravine Gardens State Park. The area is  well known for its local festivals, most notably the Florida Azalea Festival and the Blue Crab Festival.

History

The area was once the domain of the Timucuan peoples, two tribes of which existed in the Palatka region under chiefs Saturiwa and Utina. They fished bass and mullet, or hunted deer, turkeys, bear and opossum. Others farmed beans, corn, melons, squash, and tobacco. However, infectious disease that came with European contact and war devastated the tribes, and they were extinct by the mid-18th century. The last people evacuated with the Spanish to Cuba in 1763, when Spain ceded Florida to Great Britain after the Seven Years' War.

During the late eighteenth century, Creek tribes made their way to Florida.  In a process of ethnogenesis, the Seminole tribe was formed.  They called the location Pilo-taikita, meaning "crossing over" or "cows' crossing". Here the St. Johns River narrows and begins a shallower, winding course upstream to Lake George and Lake Monroe.

In 1767, Denys Rolle (1725–1797), an English gentleman and philanthropist, established Rollestown on the east bank of the St. Johns River at the head of deep-water navigation. His  plantation was a  commercial experiment, recruiting settlers off the streets of London, including paupers, vagrants, pickpockets and "penitent prostitutes". Two hundred indentured servants arrived to clear wilderness for agriculture and livestock. Unaccustomed to either hard work or a subtropical climate, however, they left. Rolle next purchased slaves from West Africa, using them to tend chickens, hogs, goats and sheep, or produce cotton, indigo, citrus and turpentine for export to Europe.

He built a mansion and laid out a village, but trouble beleaguered the "ideal society". In 1770, a disgruntled overseer sold over 1,000 of his employer's cattle and disappeared with the money. Rolle hired new overseers and bought more slaves, but the plantation failed to prosper. When Spain resumed control of Florida in 1783, Rolle abandoned the colony and chartered a ship to carry his household belongings, livestock and slaves to a  estate on Great Exuma in the Bahamas. The point, in East Palatka, is still called Rollestown.

With control by different powers in Florida came  changes of ownership in Pilo-taikita, now contracted to Pilatka. In 1774, naturalist William Bartram noted an Indian village on the west bank, but it was abandoned later . The current existence of Palatka can be traced to the settlement established there in 1821. After the United States acquired Florida in 1821, Nehemiah Brush established a ferry and bought a  tract in 1826 and another of equal size the next year. The site became a distribution point, where goods were shipped by a New York company to supply immigrants at the Grant of Arredondo, which lay to the west.

The arrival of land-hungry American settlers created confrontations with the resident Seminole. When the government attempted to relocate the tribe to the west of the Mississippi as part of Indian Removal starting in 1833, the Second Seminole War began. The Seminole attacked and burned Pilatka in 1835. Recognizing the site's strategic importance for control of the St. Johns River, the main artery into Central Florida, the US Army in 1838 established Fort Shannon, named for Captain Samuel Shannon. It included a garrison, supply depot and hospital. By 1842 most of the Seminole had moved to Indian Territory, and consequently Fort Shannon was abandoned by the army in 1843. Settlers made use of the military piers and buildings, including eight blockhouses, to develop the town. By 1847, it was growing rapidly. In 1849, Putnam County was created, with Pilatka the county seat. With the help of Judge Isaac H. Bronson, it was incorporated as a city on January 8, 1853.

During the 1850s, Florida in general and Pilatka in particular gained a reputation as a haven for invalids escaping northern winters. Steamboats carried them up the river in increasing numbers. One visitor wrote that amusements included "sailing, fishing, rowing, walking, riding in buggies and on horseback, whist, euchre, backgammon and hunting".

The tourist trend was interrupted by the Civil War, when gunboats cruised the waters and Pilatka was destitute and largely deserted. On October 7, 1862, the USS Cimarron fired several shells over the town after seeing some Confederate cavalry. Mary Boyd pleaded with Union Commander Maxwell Woodhull to spare Pilatka, assuring him that the horse soldiers were not residents. He complied.

Among the notable residents of Pilatka during the war was Confederate spy Lola Sánchez and her sisters. Sánchez became upset when their father was falsely accused of being a Confederate spy by the members of the Union Army and imprisoned. Officers of the Union Army then occupied their residence in Palatka, Florida. On one occasion Sánchez overheard various officers’ planning a raid and alerted the Confederates forces. As a result, the Confederate forces, led by Capt. John Jackson Dickison, surprised and captured the Union troops on the day of the supposed raid in what is known as the Battle of Horse Landing.

Following the war, the tourists returned, and new accommodations were constructed including the Putnam House, built by Hubbard L. Hart, and the Larkin House, which could accommodate 250 guests. Steamers ran up the Ocklawaha River to Eustis, Leesburg and Silver Springs, or the St. Johns River to Enterprise and Sanford. Industries included logging, raising cattle and hogs, and orange groves. On May 24, 1875, the post office changed the spelling to Palatka.

By the 1880s, several competing railroads crossed the community, which became an important junction. These included the Florida Southern Railroad, the Jacksonville, Tampa and Key West Railroad, the St. Augustine and Palatka Railway, and the Georgia Southern and Florida Railroad.  On November 7, 1884, Palatka suffered a devastating fire. Guests arrived that season to find no accommodations, and so continued on the train south; this was the beginning of a gradual shift of tourism elsewhere. The city lost trade, shipping and transportation preeminence to Jacksonville, on the coast. With its downtown rebuilt in brick to be fireproof, Palatka emerged a finer place.

In 1893, A. E. and H. S. Wilson of Saginaw, Michigan bought the Noah J. Tilghman & Son sawmill, which processed cypress lumber. Renamed the Wilson Cypress Company, it expanded operations and became a major employer. At its peak, it was the second largest cypress mill in the world, but closed in 1944. The Great Freeze of 1894 and 1895 destroyed Palatka's citrus groves for five years, which were formerly a major attraction. The ill-fated Cross Florida Barge Canal was once intended to pass the city. Today, tourism remains important.

Geography

The city is located in the southern portion of the Lower St. Johns River basin.

Climate

Palatka has a humid subtropical climate, Köppen climate classification Cfa. The area's warm and humid climate is caused primarily by its proximity to the Gulf Stream, which flows off the east coast of Florida. There are two major seasons which characterize the area. One is hot and rainy, lasting from June until late September. The other is the dry season, October through May, which brings more moderate temperatures and less frequent rainfall.

Cityscape

As with many cities in the United States, development has occurred in a radial pattern from the city center to beyond the incorporated area. Due to the historical importance of Palatka as a southeastern interior port, much of the urban development is oriented toward the riverfront. The eastern sections of the city, which include downtown and the historic districts, are characterized by a gridded street system. A significant amount of the original brick roads survive in this area. The western outlying suburban areas are primarily characterized by an amorphous road pattern.

The city of Palatka is actively working toward redevelopment of its riverfront and downtown area. The rise of the automobile, and the inevitable shift to a big-box economic format, has taken its toll on the once thriving regional center. Like many other American cities, Palatka's downtown has had to repurpose itself to cope with an auto-centric society.

Architecture

Several architectural styles are represented within the city. Victorian, Colonial Revival, Art Deco, Classical Revival, and Prairie School are all prominent building styles in the historical districts. One of the most notable buildings is the old James Hotel at 300 St. Johns Avenue. The hotel was constructed by Dr. George E Welch, president of the now defunct Putnam National Bank. Designed by architect Henry John Klutho in 1916, this building is a prime example of the Prairie School style. Klutho also designed the Larimer Memorial Library, named after the wife of James Ross Mellon, eldest son of Judge Thomas Mellon. The library is a fusion of Prairie School and Art Deco. Today, the building is home to the Art Council of Greater Palatka and houses local art galleries. The Larimer was added to the U.S. National Register of Historic Places in 2008.

Though there are no discernible architectural styles in the outgrowth areas, a notable building technique has been used in the construction of the  Children's Reading Center Charter School. Five monolithic dome structures crown the facility and give it a distinct style.

Neighborhoods

 Downtown
 North Historic District
 South Historic District
 Palatka Heights
 Newtown
 East Palatka
Parks and Gardens
 James C. Godwin Riverfront Park
 Hank Bryan Park
 Ravine Gardens State Park

 Veteran's Memorial Park

Museums in Palatka 
 Bronson Mulholland House
 St Johns River Center
 Putnam Historic Museum
 Mariners Museum Inc

Demographics

As of the census of 2004, there were 10,796 people, 3,880 households, and 2,421 families residing in the city. The racial makeup of the city was 48.93% White, 48.43% African American, 0.16% Native American, 0.44% Asian, 0.01% Pacific Islander, 1.04% from other races, and 1.00% from two or more races. Hispanic or Latino of any race were 2.83% of the population.

There were 3,880 households, out of which 31.5% had children under the age of 18 living with them, 34.0% were married couples living together, 24.9% had a female householder with no husband present, and 37.6% are other types of families. 32.7% of all households were made up of individuals, and 16.5% had someone living alone who was 65 years of age or older. The average household size was 2.42 and the average family size was 3.10.

In the city, the population was spread out, with 28.6% under the age of 18, 10.1% from 18 to 24, 24.6% from 25 to 44, 19.0% from 45 to 64, and 17.7% who were 65 years of age or older. The median age was 34 years. For every 100 females, there were 81.9 males. For every 100 females age 18 and over, there were 75.8 males.

The median income for a household in the city was $18,129, and the median income for a family was $26,076. Males had a median income of $27,716 versus $19,187 for females. The per capita income for the city was $11,351. About 27.9% of families and 33.1% of the population were below the poverty line, including 41.0% of those under age 18 and 19.6% of those age 65 or over.

Government

Palatka uses the commission-manager form of municipal government, with all governmental powers resting in a legislative body called a commission. Palatka's commission is composed of five elected commissioners, one being the mayor/commissioner. The mayor and commissioners serve four year terms. The offices are non-partisan; no candidate is allowed to declare a party affiliation. The role of the commission is to set policy, pass ordinances and resolutions, adopt regulations, and appoint city officials, including the city manager. While the mayor serves as a presiding officer of the commission, the city manager is the administrative head of the municipal government, and is responsible for the administration of all departments. The city commission holds its regular meetings semi-monthly on the 2nd and 4th Thursdays of the Month.

Infrastructure

Health care

Local health care is provided by the Putnam Community Medical Center. The 140-bed facility offers a medical and surgical units, 24-hour emergency department, critical care unit, skilled nursing unit,  progressive care unit, family birthplace center. Other services include a diagnostic imaging department and an outpatient rehabilitation facility. Located in Palatka, the medical center services all of Putnam County. The clinic was founded in 1959 and currently is a subsidiary of HCA Healthcare. The local health department is located at 2801 Kennedy Street in Palatka.

Education

The main center for higher education in the city is St. Johns River State College. In 1958, the institute opened its doors in Palatka to 191 students. Today the school serves Putnam, Clay, and St. Johns Counties and boasts approximately 10,000 students. The Palatka campus serves as the administrative center, it also houses the Florida School of the Arts and the local St. Leo University branch. Public primary and secondary education is operated by Putnam County Public Schools, officially known as the Putnam County School District (PCSD). According to 2007 enrollment numbers, the district is home to 12,101 students. Palatka has one public traditional high school. Palatka High School was formed in 1977 after the merger of Palatka Central High School and Palatka South High School. The Putnam County Library System serves Putnam County, Florida with five locations. The Palatka Library location operates as the systems headquarters.

Transportation

Transportation has been key in the development of Palatka since the day of its inception. Steamboats were the main economic driving force in the city's early years. The river is no longer a primary means of passenger transportation, but remains of strategic importance in the movement of goods and services. Today, airports, railroads, and highways make up the main infrastructure of passenger travel. Palatka's own transportation infrastructure remains important as it is centrally located between large population centers in Jacksonville, a large educational institute in Gainesville, and tourist hubs in St. Augustine and Orlando.

Highways
This route connects Palatka to Jacksonville (northbound) and Orlando (southbound).
  SR 15 – From Jacksonville to Orlando US 17 and SR 15 are the same route.
  SR 19 – Terminating into US 17, SR 19 extends into the cities major commercial corridor. The route extends further into the Ocala National Forest and becomes the Florida Black Bear Scenic Byway.
  SR 20 – Primary route connecting Gainesville and Palatka.
  SR 100 – Route connecting Keystone Heights, Palatka, and Bunnell
  SR 207 – Primary route connecting East Palatka and St. Augustine

The bundled US 17, SR 20 and SR 100 cross the Memorial Bridge over the St. Johns River toward East Palatka.

Mass transit
Bus transportation in the city is provided by Ride Solution. The agency is responsible for public transit throughout all of Putnam County, Florida. Established in 1986 as ARC Transit, the original paratransit services have expanded to include regular bus services, express bus services, and vanpools. Recently, bus design and manufacturing has become a way Ride Solution is helping improve community transportation. The Brevi Bus was created to handle the rugged terrain and unpaved roads of rural Putnam County. The Bus was designed locally by Ride Solution and is expected to improve access by 30 percent.

Intercity transit
Amtrak serves Palatka by the daily Silver Meteor and Silver Star intercity rail services. The Palatka Amtrak station is a historic Atlantic Coast Line Railroad depot located at 220 North Eleventh Street. The station was added in 1988 to the U.S. National Register of Historic Places.

The closest major international airport is Orlando International Airport.

Economy

The composition of the Palatka area economy is unreflective of Florida as a whole. Unlike many cities in the state, Palatka has a large manufacturing sector, employing 17.2% of the city's total civilian workforce. Comparatively, Florida's statistics indicate 5.9% of the state's entire workforce is employed by the manufacturing sector. Georgia Pacific is the single largest private employer in the city. The Koch-owned firm employs 1,470 people at its pulp, paper, and plywood operations. PDM Bridge is another large manufacturing company operating in Palatka. Their facility is located in Barge Port on the St. Johns River. The Eau Claire, Wisconsin-based bridge builder utilizes the river for the transportation of its finished products. PDM Bridge is notable for the fabrication of the Woodrow Wilson Bridge structure.

The Palatka area was of early significance in accessing the interior of the state. This significance was due to its location at the end of an expansive portion of waterway at the divide between the upper and  lower St. Johns River. First established as a trading outpost, tourism would eventually boom and fuel growth for decades. The decline of waterborne travel in Northeast Florida, and the United States in general, ultimately reduced the importance of tourism in the city. Nowadays, large international airports and bypassing interstate highways carry vacationers to destinations further south. Only 7.1% of Palatka's labor force works in arts, entertainment, recreation, accommodation, and food services, compared to Florida's 15.5% across tourist related industries.

In recent years, the Putnam County government has adopted policies focused on facilitating Ecotourism in the region. Nature trails are being expanded and kayaking waterways have been improved and mapped. Portions of the Florida Trail runs through the area and connect local hiking trails to other trail systems in parks throughout the region. Ocala National Forest  is the second largest National Forest in the state. Other large parks include Welaka State Forest, Etoniah Creek State Forest and Dunns Creek State Park. Other conservation areas exist under the management of the Putnam Land Conservancy and St. Johns River Water Management District. Both entities operate regionally and identify and protect ecologically sensitive areas. If progress continues, and ecotourism creates a vibrant local economy, economic incentives could drive further preservation of the natural habitats, benefitting the environment as a whole.

Of residents aged 16 years and over, 53.3% were in the labor force; 45.6% were employed and 7.6% unemployed. Compared to Florida's average, Palatka has a higher percentage of unemployed. Of the same survey, the State's unemployment was 4.6% of the available labor force.  The current Florida unemployment rate, published by the U.S. Bureau of Labor Statistics, stands at 7.0%. The Palatka area is bordered on all sides by four separate metropolitan statistical areas. Of those, the Deltona-Daytona Beach-Ormond Beach, Gainesville, and Jacksonville metropolitan statistical areas all had better performing unemployment statistics than Palatka in 2011, when the unemployment rate in the Palatka Micropolitan Statistical Area was 13.8%. Gainesville showed the most favorable conditions with an unemployment rate of 8.7%. Statistics for Palm Coast and Ocala both indicated unemployment rates higher than that of Palatka. Regionally, the employment numbers of Palm Coast have been hit hardest; the bedroom community has an unemployment rate currently at 16.6%.

Sites of interest

The following entries are listed on the National Register of Historic Places:
 Old Atlantic Coast Line Union Depot, home of the Palatka Railroad Preservation Society
 Bronson-Mulholland House (1854), home of the Putnam County Historical Society & Museum
 Central Academy, Florida's first accredited African-American high school
 Larimer Memorial Library
 Palatka North Historic District
 Palatka South Historic District
 Ravine Gardens State Park
 St. Mark's Episcopal Church

Gallery

Sister cities

Palatka has one sister city.
  Palatka, Russia (1991)

See also
 List of people from Palatka, Florida

References

External links

 City of Palatka
 Palatka Daily News
 Historic issues of the Palatka Daily News (1884-1888), Palatka News (1905, 1907), Palatka News and Advertiser (1902-1905, 1910-1917), and the Palatka Daily News (1919, 1921-1922) at Florida and Puerto Rico Digital Newspaper Project 
 Palatka Florida local guide
 St. Johns River State College
 Palatka Florida Community News
 Palatka Bluegrass Festival
 Ride Solution local public transit
 

 
Cities in Putnam County, Florida
Populated places on the St. Johns River
County seats in Florida
Micropolitan areas of Florida
Populated places established in 1821
Cities in Florida
1821 establishments in Florida Territory
Utopian communities in the United States